The Grade II listed structure of Mumbles Pier is an  long Victorian pleasure pier built in 1898.  It is located at the south-western corner of Swansea Bay near the village of Mumbles, within the city and county of Swansea, Wales.

History

Construction
Designed by W. Sutcliffe Marsh and promoted by John Jones Jenkins of the Rhondda and Swansea Bay Railway, the pier opened on 10 May 1898 at a cost of £10,000. It was the western terminus for the world's first passenger carrying horsecar railway, the Swansea and Mumbles Railway; and a major terminal for the White Funnel paddle steamers of P & A Campbell, unloading tourists from routes along the River Severn and Bristol Channel.

Heyday
In the summer of 1899, Will C. Pepper, father of the musicians Harry S. Pepper and Dick Pepper, founded a long-running concert party on the pier called the White Coons.

The Amusement Equipment Company (AMECO) gained a licence to operate the pier from 1 October 1937. The pier was requisitioned in World War II, but AMECO acquired the freehold in 1957, extensively reconstructing the facility and adding a landing jetty. A new arcade was built on the pier's frontage in 1966. AMECO spent between £25,000 and £30,000 per annum on the maintenance and replacement of the steelwork between 1975 and 1985.

Renovation
The pier closed on 1 October 1987 for a £40,000 refit, which included renewal of the steel around the entrance. The pier reopened on Good Friday 1988.

By the early 21st century the pier had fallen into a state of disrepair with a large section fenced off to visitors and other areas patched up to maintain safety.  The owners planned to repair the pier and to regenerate the nearby area.  The plans included the building of a new hotel and spa, a conference and exhibition centre and a new boardwalk linking the Knab rock with the pier.

During a major renovation in 2012, a new lifeboat station and RNLI gift shop was built at the end of the pier and fishing platforms added.

Today
The pier is used for fishing and tourism, offering panoramic views of Swansea Bay with the Mumbles Lighthouse on one side and Port Talbot on the other. The pier complex is owned, according to the last accounts submitted to Companies House (UK company registration agency) Ameco Leisure Group Limited is considered the ultimate parent company of Amusement Equipment Co. Limited as it holds 100% of the issued share capital of Amusement Equipment Co. Limited. The ultimate controlling party is Mr F S Bollom and Mr A J Bollom by virtue of holding 100% of the issued share capital of the parent company, Ameco Leisure Group Limited.

An entertainment complex on the land at the base of the pier includes bars, restaurant, an ice-skating rink (opened in 2006 and featured in an ITV Wales documentary series) and an amusement arcade. The amusement arcade contains over 100 arcade machines and a miniature bowling alley on the upper floor.

Lifeboat station
The Mumbles Lifeboat Station at the end of the pier houses a Tamar-class lifeboat. The old lifeboat station building is on the north side of the pier, to which it is connected by a walkway. In 2019 plans were announced to convert the old lifeboat station into a visitor centre and restaurant.

Arcade

Cafe (then: Buffet) arcade
Neo Geo MVS (1992–1996) (Neo Geo MVS – 6 Slot: Blue's Journey (1990), Cyber-Lip (1990), Ninja Combat (1990) and Many More) 
Wonder Boy (1996) (Standard Cabinet)

Amusement arcade facilities

Arcade games 
Monkey Mole Panic (1992) (Standard Cabinet)
Neo Geo MVS (1992–1996) (Neo Geo MVS – 6 Slot: Blue's Journey (1990), Cyber-Lip (1990), Ninja Combat (1990) and Many More) (Standard Cabinet) 
Super Street Fighter II Turbo (1994) (Deluxe Cabinet) 
Tekken 2 (1995) (Standard Cabinet) 
Wonder Boy (1986) (Standard Cabinet)

Pinball 
Street Fighter II Pinball (1993) (Pinball Cabinet)

Children's rides 
Noddy kiddie ride (1990s)

References

External links
GowerUK.com - Mumbles Pier
Mumbles Pier
www.geograph.co.uk : photos of Mumbles Pier and surrounding area
 “Mumbles Pier, Past and Present”

Piers in Wales
Swansea Bay
Grade II listed buildings in Swansea
Transport infrastructure completed in 1898
Tourist attractions in Swansea
pier